MBB may refer to:

Television
 Men Behaving Badly, a British television sitcom
 Mrs. Brown's Boys, a television sitcom

Brands and enterprises
 Malayan Banking Berhad, a bank and financial group in Malaysia
 McKinsey, Boston, Bain, the world's three largest strategy consulting firms, see Big Three (management consultancies)
 Messerschmitt-Bölkow-Blohm, a former West German aircraft company, now part of Airbus

Other uses
 Magandang Balita Biblia, a Tagalog translation of the Holy Bible
 Maharaja Bir Bikram University, in Tripura, India
 Make-before-break, a type of contact arrangement of an electrical switch
 Marginal Budgeting for Bottlenecks, a planning and costing tool to "buy health results" 
 Master Black Belt, a certification in the study of Six Sigma and Lean Six Sigma
 Medal for Bravery (Bronze), an honour in Hong Kong
 Men's Basketball, men's college basketball
 Millie Bobby Brown, an English actress
 Minimum bounding box, the box or hyperrectangle of minimal dimensions that contains the set of interest
 Mobile broadband, the name used to describe various types of wireless high-speed internet access through a portable modem, telephone, or other device
 Molecular Biology and Biochemistry, the name of departments in several universities
 Montgomery bus boycott